Kapsukas may refer to:

Vincas Mickevičius-Kapsukas, a communist Lithuanian political activist 
Marijampolė, a city in Lithuania formerly called Kapsukas, in honor of Vincas Kapsukas